Raisa Reyzen was a Russian Empire film actress.

Selected filmography 
 1909 — Mazeppa
 1914 — Chrysanthemums
 1915 — Leon Drey

References

External links 
 Раиса Рейзен on kino-teatr.ru

Actresses from the Russian Empire
1888 births
1956 deaths